Special Rural Properties are a type of property ranging from two to ten hectares (or five to twenty five acres) allowing the owners to engage in special types of rural pursuits without needing a very large property or working farm. The types of uses are generally similar throughout Western Australia, although most local municipalities or shires often adjust the uses permissible to suit. Typical uses include a small area of agriculture or horticulture as well as the keeping of small numbers of animals. With these uses available, a Special Rural Property can provide what is locally known as a "hobby farm" for people used to living in the city for a fraction of the cost of a real working farm. People who have these hobby farms are aften referred to "Tree Changers" characterized as being tired of living in the city and desiring to live a rural country life.

Special Rural Properties are often close to the city or smaller townships throughout Western Australia. There are many places such as Beverley, Lower Chittering, Chittering, Leschenault and Woodridge that have Special Rural Properties as well as property developers that specialise in creating Special Rural Properties.

Geography of Western Australia